Pygmy flying squirrels (Petaurillus) are a genus of flying squirrels.

Species
Lesser pygmy flying squirrel Petaurillus emiliae Thomas, 1908   
Hose's pygmy flying squirrel Petaurillus hosei (Thomas, 1900)   
Selangor pygmy flying squirrel Petaurillus kinlochii (Robinson and Kloss, 1911)

References

 
Flying squirrels
Taxa named by Oldfield Thomas